Valentine is a Canadian chain of over 100 privately owned restaurant franchises operating in the province of Quebec, Canada. In September 2010 it became a subsidiary of MTY Food Group which purchased the brand rights for $9.3 million.

History
The first restaurant opened in 1979 in Saint-Hyacinthe, Quebec. A few years later, its founder, Jean-Pierre Robin, opened a second restaurant in Saint-Hyacinthe in order to meet the demand for its "famous hot-dogs".
The chain's success increases and becomes a turning point: the brothers opt for franchising as the company's mode of functioning for its future restaurants. As time passes, more franchises are bought and restaurants open throughout Quebec. During the 1990s, the chain underwent a major renewal plan in which the restaurants' design changed along with the company's colours.

The company's fare is typical Canadian fast food, such as burgers, fries, sandwiches and poutine. The company employs humor in its advertising.  It offers an app that records footsteps.  After 10,000 steps, the user is eligible for a poutine.

References

Fast-food chains of Canada
Restaurants established in 1979
1979 establishments in Quebec
Companies based in Saint-Hyacinthe